Events from the year 1897 in the United States.

Incumbents

Federal Government 
 President: Grover Cleveland (D-New York) (until March 4), William McKinley (R-Ohio) (starting March 4)
 Vice President: Adlai E. Stevenson I (D-Illinois) (until March 4), Garret Hobart (R-New Jersey) (starting March 4)
 Chief Justice: Melville Fuller (Illinois)
 Speaker of the House of Representatives: Thomas Brackett Reed (R-Maine)
 Congress: 54th (until March 4), 55th (starting March 4)

Events

January–March
 January 2 – Alpha Omicron Pi sorority is founded at Barnard College in New York City
 February 19 – United States Copyright Office established as a department in the Library of Congress.
 February 22 – Black Hills National Forest is established.
 March 4 – William McKinley is sworn in as the 25th President of the United States, and Garret Hobart is sworn in as Vice President of the United States.
 March 9 — Cordelia A. Greene Library is established in Castile, New York

April–June
 April 19 – The first Boston Marathon is run, with fifteen men competing, and won by John McDermott.
 April 27 – Grant's Tomb is dedicated in New York.
 May 1 – The Tennessee Centennial Exposition opens in Nashville, for 6 months, illuminated by many electric lights.
 June 1 – American miners begin a strike, which successfully establishes the United Mine Workers Union and brings about the 8-hour work day to mines.
 June 2 – Mark Twain, responding to rumors that he is dead, is quoted by the New York Journal as saying, "The report of my death was an exaggeration."

July–September
 July 17 – The Klondike Gold Rush begins when the first successful prospectors arrive in Seattle.
 July 31 – Mount Saint Elias, the second highest peak in the United States and Canada, is first ascended.
 August 21 – Oldsmobile is founded in Lansing, Michigan by Ransom E. Olds.
 August 31 – Thomas Edison is granted a patent for the Kinetoscope, a precursor of the movie projector.
 September 1 – The Boston subway opens, becoming the first underground metro in North America.
 September 10 – Lattimer Massacre: A sheriff's posse kills more than 19 unarmed immigrant miners in Pennsylvania.
 September 21 – In response to a letter written by 8-year-old Virginia O'Hanlon, The Sun (New York City) publishes an editorial by Francis Pharcellus Church stating, "Yes, Virginia, there is a Santa Claus".

October–December
 October 4 – Columbia University opens its new campus in New York City.
 October 12 – The USS Baltimore (Cruiser # 3, later CM-1) is recommissioned, since 1890, for several months of duty in the Hawaiian Islands.
 October 23 – The Kappa Delta sorority is founded at State Female Normal School, later Longwood University, in Farmville, Virginia.
 November 1 – The Library of Congress Building in Washington, D.C., designed by Paul J. Pelz, is opened.

Undated
 Elbridge Ayer Burbank begins painting portraits of Native Americans in the United States from life.
 Women photographers Zaida Ben-Yusuf and Gertrude Käsebier open portrait studios in New York City.
 Florist's Review trade magazine is founded.
 The Auburn University Marching Band is created at Auburn University (known at this date as the Agricultural and Mechanical College of Alabama) in Auburn, Alabama.

Ongoing
 Gay Nineties (1890–1899)
 Progressive Era (1890s–1920s)
 Lochner era (c. 1897–c. 1937)

Births 
 January 3 – Marion Davies, film actress (died 1961)
 February 27 – Marian Anderson, African American contralto (died 1993)
 March 2 – Minor Hall, jazz drummer (died 1959)
 March 4 – Lefty O'Doul, baseball player and restaurateur (died 1969)
 March 8 – Charles W. Brooks, U.S. Senator from Illinois from 1940 to 1949 (died 1957)
 March 11 – Henry Cowell, composer (died 1965)
 March 24 – Theodora Kroeber, writer and anthropologist (died 1979)
 April 26 – Eddie Eagan, Olympic gold medal boxer and bobsledder (died 1967)
 May 6 – William A. Purtell, U.S. Senator from Connecticut in 1952 and from 1953 to 1959 (died 1978)
 June 6 – Homer E. Capehart, U.S. Senator from Indiana from 1945 to 1963 (died 1979)
 July 9 – Albert C. Wedemeyer, U.S. Army general (died 1989)
 July 10 – John Gilbert, silent film actor (died 1936)
 July 24 – Amelia Earhart, aviation pioneer and author
 September 24 – Lee Fenner, American footballer (died 1964)
 September 25 – William Faulkner, novelist, recipient of the Nobel Prize in Literature in 1949 (died 1962)
 October 22 – Marjorie Flack, children's author (died 1958)
 November 2 – Richard Russell, Jr., U.S. Senator from Georgia from 1933 to 1971 (died 1971)
 November 8 – Dorothy Day, journalist and social activist (died 1980)

Deaths 
 June 14 1897 Juan Domingo Montoya civil war combat veteran. Mosquero canyon, New Mexico. Valverde, glorieta pass
 April 10 – Daniel W. Voorhees, U.S. Senator from Indiana from 1877 to 1897 (born 1827)
 April 23 – John Henry Raap, Chicago entrepreneur and retailer (born 1840)
 August 14 – James Z. George, U.S. Senator from Mississippi from 1881 to 1897 (born 1826)
 October 3 – Samuel J. R. McMillan, U.S. Senator from Minnesota from 1875 to 1887 (born 1826)
 October 11 – Charles W. Jones, Ireland-born U.S. Senator from Florida from 1875 to 1887 (born 1834)
 October 29 – 
 Henry George, writer, politician and political economist (born 1839)
 William J. Babcock, Medal of Honor recipient (born 1841 in the United States)
 October 31 – Richard Von Albade Gammon, University of Georgia football fullback (died from in-game injury) (born 1879)
 November 3 – Thomas Lanier Clingman, North Carolina congressman, senator and confederate general (born 1812)

See also
 List of American films of the 1890s
 Timeline of United States history (1860–1899)

References

External links
 

 
1890s in the United States
United States
United States
Years of the 19th century in the United States